Feminine wipes are cleansing cloths meant to clean the vaginal area. They can be used during menstruation or for everyday use to protect from infection.
Feminine hygiene